Creately is a SaaS visual collaboration tool with diagramming and design capabilities designed by Cinergix. Creately has two versions: an online cloud edition and a downloadable offline edition for desktop which is compatible with Windows, Mac and Linux. The application is mostly known for creating flowcharts, organization charts, project charts, UML diagrams, mind maps,  and other business visuals.

History 
The initial beta version of Creately was released by Chandika Jayasundara. Hiraash Thawfeek, Nick Foster and Karamjit Singh joined the project in the same year. Presently Chandika Jayasundara is serving as CEO of Cinergix. The headquarters of the company is located at Mentone, Victoria, Australia.

Features and reception 
Creately provides predefined templates and diagram elements for incorporating in the projects. It provides drag and drop feature with which both predefined and custom made shapes can be included to build the desired diagram while the same workspace can be shared with multiple persons for collaboration.

Some experts have reviewed the application by commenting on its lacking in accessible integration options as its downside. The company claims Creately to have integration feature with Slack, Confluence while not having the integration with Zapier and Onedrive yet. It is compatible with Google Drive and Dropbox. The software is available as both freemium and paid option.

See also 

 Data visualization
 Data flow diagram
 Mind mapping
 Technical drawing
 Infographic

References

External links 
 

Diagramming software
HTML5
Data visualization software
Graphics software
Cloud applications
Collaborative software
2008 software